Sredny Ikorets is a rural locality (a selo) and the administrative center of Sredneikoretskoye Rural Settlement, Liskinsky District, Voronezh Oblast, Russia. There are 31 streets.

Geography 
Sredny Ikorets is located 24 km northeast of Liski (the district's administrative centre) by road. Peskovatka is the nearest rural locality.

References 

Rural localities in Liskinsky District